Farsiyeh (also Romanized as Fārsīyeh and Farsīyeh; also known as Dāf) is a village in Binalud Rural District, in the Central District of Nishapur County, Razavi Khorasan Province, Iran. At the 2006 census, its population was 33, in 10 families.

References 

Populated places in Nishapur County